The Garmin Fenix series (styled fēnix; pronounced as phoenix), is a selection of multisport watches produced by Garmin, first introduced in 2012. They use the Global Positioning System (GPS) and measure distance, speed, heart rate, time, altitude, pace, etc.

Models

See also
Garmin Forerunner
List of Garmin products

Notes
a. The mid-size Fenix 7 and the second-generation Epix are essentially the same watches, except for the display and battery life. The Fenix series continues to use a transflective memory-in-pixel (MiP) display, while the Epix features a bright AMOLED color display, which in turn consumes more battery.

References

External links 
Garmin Fenix 6 site

Sport of athletics equipment
Garmin
Global Positioning System